Rae is the second studio album by American singer and songwriter Ashe. It was released on October 14, 2022, by Mom + Pop.

Background 
On May 7, 2021, Ashe released her debut studio album Ashlyn which received positive reviews. Reflecting on her debut album, Ashe said that its content was "so off the heels of my divorce and going through all this turmoil and toxicity". In contrast, she believes that Rae is "grounded in confidence, sexual freedom, excitement, and liberation".

Release and promotion 
The first single to be released from Rae was "Another Man's Jeans" on March 3, 2022. Ashe performed the track on May 19 on Late Night with Seth Meyers. Second single "Hope You're Not Happy" debuted on May 6, 2022.

On June 22, 2022, alongside the release of third single "Angry Woman", Rae was announced to be releasing on October 14, 2022. The music video for "Angry Woman" was directed by Jason Lester and inspired by Yoko Ono's Cut Piece performance from 1964. Like Cut Piece, the video features Ashe's clothes being cut off her body until she is naked in the final shot.

Track listing

References 

2022 albums
Ashe (singer) albums
Mom + Pop Music albums